The 1958 Western Michigan Broncos football team represented Western Michigan University in the Mid-American Conference (MAC) during the 1958 NCAA University Division football season.  In their second season under head coach Merle Schlosser, the Broncos compiled a 4–5 record (2–4 against MAC opponents), finished in fifth place in the MAC, and were outscored by their opponents, 200 to 188.  The team played its home games at Waldo Stadium in Kalamazoo, Michigan.

Guard Jack Krueger and center Jim Eger were the team captains. Fullback Lovell Coleman received the team's most outstanding player award. Coleman rushed for 1,068 yards in the 1958, including a school record 279 yards against Central Michigan.

Schedule

References

Western Michigan
Western Michigan Broncos football seasons
Western Michigan Broncos football